Trophy Kids is a 2011 film directed by Josh Sugarman, produced by Brandon Yankowitz, and written by the pair. Trophy Kids stars Ryan Eggold, David Gallagher, Tahyna Tozzi, Nathan Lee Graham, Tibor Feldman, Tania Raymonde, David Thornton, Chris Beetem, Adam Grupper, Eleanor Reissa, and Isiah Whitlock, Jr.

The film's title refers to the generation of Americans also known as "Millennials," who grew up receiving trophies and other praise just for participating and not necessarily for excelling. They were rewarded to improve their self-esteem. As a result, trophy kids feel confident and accomplished, but the coddling has led them to feel entitled with often unrealistic expectations about their jobs and life in general.

Plot
To win the celebrity and self-made wealth he craves, an aimless, twenty-something Manhattan playboy devises a film based on his party-boy, club-going lifestyle, and hires a self-destructive aspiring playwright to ghost the feature script. As the mismatched pair struggles to complete the script and get a handle on their misdirected lives, they reveal the sometimes comedic, sometimes tragic behaviors of 'Generation Y'- a generation taught to believe each was incomparably special and messianically gifted. Though they begin to vie for the affections of the same girl, and their chance at success and happiness threatens to crumble, they ultimately each find their own, unique life truths.

Production
Trophy Kids was filmed in New York City and wrapped principal photography in early July 2009.

References

 Matt Mitovich (July 16, 2009), "90210's Ryan Eggold Is Proud of His Trophy Kids", TvGuide.com (accessed August 25, 2009)

External links
 
 

2011 films
Films shot in New York City
2010s English-language films
American comedy-drama films
2010s American films